Abdelkader Chékhémani (born 18 July 1971 in Barentin) is a French former middle distance runner who competed in the 1996 Summer Olympics.

Competition record

References

1971 births
Living people
French male middle-distance runners
Olympic athletes of France
Athletes (track and field) at the 1996 Summer Olympics
Universiade medalists in athletics (track and field)
People from Barentin
Sportspeople from Seine-Maritime
Universiade gold medalists for France
Medalists at the 1995 Summer Universiade
Medalists at the 1993 Summer Universiade
20th-century French people
21st-century French people